Premier Lacrosse League (PLL) is an American professional field lacrosse league, composed of 8 teams. The league's inaugural season debuted on June 1, 2019, and included a 14-week tour-based schedule taking place in 12 major-market cities. The league was founded by the American professional lacrosse player Paul Rabil and his brother Mike Rabil. Investors include The Chernin Group, The Raine Group and Joe Tsai.

Founding 
In September 2018, Bloomberg reported that Paul Rabil would be launching a new professional lacrosse league. The PLL would be a direct competitor to the more established Major League Lacrosse. The new league will provide professional lacrosse players with salaries, health care, and league equity.

The league's media model radically differs from that of most North American professional sports leagues. A 2018 Sports Illustrated story on the then-prospective league pointed out that LeBron James' Instagram account "features virtually no clips of him playing basketball—those are the property of the NBA, meaning its owners." By contrast, the PLL open-sources its highlights, allowing players to freely use them to build their own personal brands. Additionally, PLL operates a full-time studio that produces other player-centered content.

The PLL features eight teams, each with a 26-player roster. As opposed to tying teams to a specific market, the league tours 12 different "major market cities". The season includes 14 weeks, comprising 10 regular-season weekends, 1 all-star weekend, and 3 playoff weekends, running from June 1 through September 21, assuring there is no overlap with the NCAA Lacrosse or National Lacrosse League seasons.

By October 2018, 140 players had been signed by the PLL. Of the 140 players are 86 All-Americans, 25 members of the U.S. national team, and 10 former Tewaaraton Award winners. By December the league had signed 17 additional players.

Draft 
For the League's inaugural season, the PLL had the 6 founding teams draft a player in each of the 4 rounds. For the first round there was a random draw and the reverse the order every round. Archers had the first draft pick in the newly formed league, taking Pat Spencer making him the first player ever drafted in the PLL.

Media and business partners 

The league had an exclusive media rights agreement with NBC Sports Group, until 2022, when the league signed a new media rights deal with ESPN.

IMG Academy is the official Preseason Training Facility. Champion is the exclusive footwear and apparel brand. Capital One Bank will be the official bank sponsor for the entire PLL and the jersey patch sponsor for the Atlas LC. In February 2020, Ticketmaster signed a deal with the PLL to become the official ticket sales company of the league, as well as having their name added to the league's name, making it "Premier Lacrosse League Powered by Ticketmaster". The PLL has an exclusive partnership with DraftKings, covering betting on the league's matches. The league also partners with Gatorade, as the beverage company acts as one of the league's founding sponsors. On July 22, 2021, HEX Performance was named the 'official laundry partner' of the PLL.

Teams

Expansion

2020
The addition of the Waterdogs Lacrosse Club, a seventh team for the 2020 season, allows for natural bye weeks to occur for each team throughout the season. Paul Rabil first hinted at expansion in a post game interview after the 2019 Championship game and on January 1, 2020 the Premier Lacrosse League announced the Waterdogs identity. An expansion draft took place on February 12 and an entry draft occurred on March 16 to build the new roster with veteran players.

2021
On December 16, 2020 it was announced that the PLL and MLL had merged under the banner of the PLL. The PLL would add the Boston Cannons for the 2021 season, rebranded as the Cannons Lacrosse Club, to bring the total PLL teams to eight. Small tweaks to the former Boston Cannons branding resulted in a PLL crest and logo reveal on January 12, 2021.

2022 
In July of 2022, Ticketmaster tracked a 38% growth in tickets purchased and attendance. The PLL also announced the approved Series D round of funding for the league which was being led by return investor The Chernin Group  (TCG). Other investors include Blue Pool Capitol, Brett Jefferson, WWE, 35V, Kevin Durant, Rich Klieman, Wheelhouse Entertainment, and Pomp Investments.

2023
On December 12, 2022, the PLL announced a new mini event, the 2023 Championship Series, which took place in late February 2023 at The St. James indoor stadium in Springfield, Virginia.

Four top teams from last season competed: Archers LC, Atlas LC, Chrome LC, and Whipsnakes LC will play with 12-man rosters (10 position players and 2 goalies). Each team played three round-robin games from Wednesday, February 22 through Friday, February 24 to determine seeding for the semifinals on Saturday, February 25. The winners advanced to the PLL Championship Series game on Sunday, February 26.

Rules: Games were played in a "fast-paced Olympics format" and sixes-style game play with four 8-minute quarters on a smaller 70-by-36-meter field. It combined box lacrosse with field lacrosse, which featured a 13-yard, 2-point arc. There was a 30-second shot clock for each team's possession. Instead of taking face-offs after goals are scored, goalies restarted play immediately with a clear. The games were broadcast on ESPN2 and streaming on ESPN+ with the Championship game on ESPNU. The PLL Championship Series champions were Chrome LC who defeated the Atlas LC in the final 24-23.

Despite his team just coming up short, Atlas midfielder Romar Dennis took home the Golden Stick Award for scoring 34 points, including 15 two-point goals.

Championship history

Awards

Hall of Fame 
On February 15, 2022, the Premier Lacrosse League announced the inaugural class of the Professional Lacrosse Hall of Fame. In order to be eligible for selection, a player must:

 Be retired from professional play for at least three years
 Have played five seasons in MLL/PLL
 Be nominated by a member of the Hall of Fame committee and receive a 75 percent majority vote

The inaugural class was:

Attack 
 Casey Powell
 John Grant Jr.
 Mark Millon

Midfield 

 Gary Gait
 Jay Jalbert
 Matt Striebel

Defense 

 Pat McCabe
 John Gagliardi
 Nicky Polanco

Goaltender 

 Brian Dougherty

Specialist 

 Paul Cantabene

Paul Rabil announced Ryan Boyle as the first member of the 2023 class during a broadcast on February 22, 2023. The remainder of the 2023 class will be announced on March 23, 2023.

References

External links

 
Lacrosse leagues in the United States
Lacrosse leagues in Canada
Sports leagues established in 2018
Professional sports leagues in the United States
Professional sports leagues in Canada
Multi-national professional sports leagues
2018 establishments in North America